The Fox family is a family with several members in the acting and related professions over a number of generations. Robin Fox (1913–1971), an actor and theatrical agent, and his wife Angela Worthington, actress and daughter of the English playwright Frederick Lonsdale, had three sons: the actors James and Edward Fox, and Robert, who became a theatrical agent. Their grandchildren include the actors Emilia, Freddie, Laurence, Lydia and Jack Fox. 

Robin Fox was the grandson of Samson Fox (1838–1903), a British engineer, industrialist and philanthropist.

Dynastic roots

Robin Fox was born in the parish of St George Hanover Square, Westminster, the son of Hilda Louise (Alcock), an actress, and Arthur William Fox, the son of industrialist Samson Fox. He was related to the Hanbury and Neilson acting dynasty, through his mother, whose sister was the stage actress Lily Hanbury. Their first cousin Julia Neilson was married to the actor Fred Terry, brother of the late nineteenth-century star Ellen Terry. Altogether, five of Hilda and Lily Hanbury's first cousins were actors in Victorian and Edwardian theatre.

Family
Robin Fox (1913–1971), theatrical agent, married Angela Muriel Darita Worthington, actress, three sons
Edward Fox (born 1937), actor, married twice
(i) Tracy Reed, actress, (1958–1961), one child
Lucy Preston, Viscountess Gormanston (born Lucy Arabella Fox, 1960), married twice
(i) David Grenfell, one child
Harry Grenfell (born 1987)
(ii) Nicholas Preston, 17th Viscount Gormanston
(ii) Joanna David, actress, (2004 to date), two children
Emilia Fox (born 1974), actress, was married to actor Jared Harris (2005–2009). She also had a relationship with the actor Jeremy Gilley with whom she had one child.
Rose Gilley (born 2010)
Freddie Fox, (born 1989), actor
 
James Fox (born 1939), actor, married Mary Elizabeth Piper (died 2020) in 1973, five children
Tom Fox (born 1975)
Robin C. Fox (born 1976)
Laurence Fox (born 1978), actor, married Billie Piper in 2007, divorced in 2016, two children
Winston James Fox (born 2008)
Eugene Pip Fox (born 2012)
Lydia Fox (born 1979), actress, married Richard Ayoade in 2007, three children
Esme Bibi Ayoade (born 2009)
Ida Ayoade
? Ayoade
Jack Fox, actor (born 1985)

Robert Fox (born 1952), theatre and film producer, married three times
(i) Celestia  Sporborg (married 1975–90), casting director, three children
(ii) Natasha Richardson (1990–92), actress
(iii) Fiona Golfar (1996 to date), editor at the magazine Vogue, two children

References

External links

 
English families
Show business families of the United Kingdom
Acting families